Rubab Raza (born January 15, 1991) is an Olympic and national-record-holding swimmer from Pakistan. She became Pakistan's first female Olympic swimmer when she swam at the 2004 Olympics.

At the 2004 Summer Olympics, she swam the 50m Freestyle, though unable to progress through the first round she undoubtedly opened up the opportunity for future female Pakistani swimmers. She became the second Pakistani female to compete at the Olympics—following Shabana Akhtar at the 1996 Olympics—shortly before the country's third female competitor, Sumaira Zahoor, who ran the 1500m at the 2004 Games a few days after Raza swam. At the age of 13 at the time of her Olympic race, Raza was the youngest Pakistani female ever to compete at an Olympics.

The Pakistani Swimming Federation funded her with only $30 a month, but she was fortunate to have support from her father who is a retired army major and her mother who is a doctor.

She has won a number of national titles, and has seen success at Asian swimming tournaments. She also won a gold medal in 50m freestyle at Islamic Women's Solidarity Games in Tehran, Iran.

She has also swum for Pakistan at the:
 2006 South Asian Games
 2006 Commonwealth Games

References

External links

1991 births
Living people
Pakistani female swimmers
Olympic swimmers of Pakistan
Swimmers at the 2004 Summer Olympics
Swimmers at the 2006 Commonwealth Games
Swimmers from Lahore
Convent of Jesus and Mary, Lahore alumni
Sportswomen from Punjab, Pakistan
South Asian Games silver medalists for Pakistan
South Asian Games bronze medalists for Pakistan
South Asian Games medalists in swimming
Commonwealth Games competitors for Pakistan
21st-century Pakistani women